Wires and Sparks is the fourth studio album by Polish singer/songwriter Pati Yang. The album was produced by Joseph Cross and released by EMI Music Poland on 17 May 2011. An EP under the same name is due to come out in UK on 9 April on Godmama Records .

Track listing 

Pati Yang albums
2011 albums